Raša Sraka Vuković (born 10 October 1979 in Ljubljana, Slovenia) is a Slovenian judoka. She competed in the 70 kg event at the 2012 Summer Olympics. where she lost in the quarterfinals to Hwang Ye-Sul and in the repechage to Yuri Alvear.

References

External links

 
 

1979 births
Living people
Slovenian female judoka
Judoka at the 2004 Summer Olympics
Judoka at the 2012 Summer Olympics
Olympic judoka of Slovenia
Sportspeople from Ljubljana
Mediterranean Games gold medalists for Slovenia
Mediterranean Games silver medalists for Slovenia
Competitors at the 2001 Mediterranean Games
Competitors at the 2005 Mediterranean Games
Competitors at the 2009 Mediterranean Games
Mediterranean Games medalists in judo